The Dominican Summer League White Sox or DSL White Sox are a rookie league affiliate of the Chicago White Sox based in the Dominican Republic. They play in the Boca Chica Baseball City division of the Dominican Summer League.

History
The team first came into existence in 1989 as a joint affiliate of the Houston Astros and the Texas Rangers. From 1990 to 1993, and again in 1995, the team shared an affiliation with the Baltimore Orioles.  The team suspended operations for the 1994 season.  In 1996, the team shared an affiliation with the Milwaukee Brewers, before suspending operations again for 1997.  The team returned in 1998 with a shared affiliation with the Anaheim Angels.  The team became an independent White Sox affiliate in 1999, which they have remained ever since.  For the 2007 and 2008 seasons, the team split into DSL White Sox 1 and DSL White Sox 2.

Roster

References

Chicago White Sox minor league affiliates
Dominican Summer League teams
Baseball teams in the Dominican Republic